Khandia is a village and former petty Rajput princely state on Saurashtra peninsula in Gujarat, western India.

History 
The non-salute princely state in Jhalawar prant was ruled by Jhala Rajput Chieftains. It comprised only the village.

In 1901 it has a population of 627, yielding a state revenue of 4,000 Rupees (1903-4, only from land), paying a 900 Rupees tribute to the British, Junagarh State and Sukhdi State.

Sources and external links 
 Imperial Gazetteer on dsal.uchicago.edu - Kathiawar

Princely states of Gujarat
Rajput princely states